John F Kennedy (foaled 7 February 2012) is a retired Irish-bred Thoroughbred racehorse and an active stallion standing in Argentina. He was beaten as an odds on favourite on his debut but won his next two races, the latter being the Juvenile Turf Stakes that turned out to be the last win in his racing career. At the end of 2014 he had been one of the antepost favourites for the 2015 Epsom Derby, though he did not run in it after all.

Background 

John F Kennedy's sire is leading sire Galileo and his dam is a dual group 1 winning filly Rumplestiltskin. He is a full brother of Tapestry, the winner of the 2014 Yorkshire Oaks. He was bred from the highly successful Galileo Danehill cross which has produced horses including Frankel, Roderic O'Connor and Teofilo. He is named after the 35th President of the United States John F Kennedy.

Racing career

2014: two-year-old season
John F Kennedy's career began in a Maiden race over a Mile at Leopardstown Racecourse. He began odds on favourite but was beaten 2 and a half lengths by the Jim Bolger trained Hall of Fame under a ride by Joseph O'Brien. He won his next start at The Curragh by 4 and a half lengths. Despite an entry in the Racing Post Trophy his final start of 2014 came back at Leopardstown in the Juvenile Turf Stakes which he won beating stablemate East India.

2015: three-year-old season
In the early part of 2015, John F Kennedy maintained his position as antepost favourite for the Derby before making his seasonal debut in the Group 3 Ballysax Stakes at Leopardstown on 12 April. He started the 1/4 favourite but finished last of the three runners behind Success Days and Zafilani, beaten ten and a half lengths by the winner. On 14 May, he ran in the Group 2 Dante Stakes at York and finished last of the seven runners, beaten by Golden Horn. After the race, trainer Aidan O'Brien said that he would not field John F Kennedy in the Derby.

John F Kennedy's next start was Group 3 KPMG Enterprise Stakes at Leopardstown on 12 September, where he was beaten by Fascinating Rock and finished third out of five runners.

2016: four-year-old season
Before the 2016 season, John F Kennedy was purchased by an Argentinian group of breeders and moved to California, U.S. He finished seventh out of eight runners in an allowance optional claiming race on 15 May at Santa Anita Park and retired to become a stallion in Argentina.

Stud career
As of 2021, he is standing at Haras Abolengo in Buenos Aires, Argentina. His progeny includes Cool Day, who won the 2020 Gran Premio Carlos Pellegrini and the 2021 Gran Premio Copa de Oro.

Pedigree

References

External links
 Career 1-2-3 Colour Chart – John F Kennedy

2012 racehorse births
Racehorses bred in Ireland
Racehorses trained in Ireland
Thoroughbred family 20